Bowling Green is a city in Hardee County, Florida, United States. The population was 2,930 at the 2010 census.

Geography

Demographics

At the 2000 census there were 2,892 people in 815 households, including 647 families, in the city. The racial makeup of the city was 57.05% White, 13.52% African American, 0.83% Native American, 0.35% Asian, 0.31% Pacific Islander, 26.00% from other races, and 1.94% from two or more races. Hispanic or Latino of any race were 46.06%.

Of the 815 households 41.3% had children under the age of 18 living with them, 54.5% were married couples living together, 18.3% had a female householder with no husband present, and 20.6% were non-families. 12.8% of households were one person and 7.1% were one person aged 65 or older. The average household size was 3.44 and the average family size was 3.68.

The age distribution was 33.1% under the age of 18, 12.2% from 18 to 24, 27.8% from 25 to 44, 16.0% from 45 to 64, and 10.9% 65 or older. The median age was 28 years. For every 100 females, there were 108.8 males. For every 100 females age 18 and over, there were 106.7 males.

The median household income was $28,209 and the median family income  was $28,333. Males had a median income of $22,695 versus $17,125 for females. The per capita income for the city was $9,978. About 22.0% of families and 30.5% of the population were below the poverty line, including 33.5% of those under age 18 and 20.5% of those age 65 or over.

In 2010 Bowling Green had a population of 2,930.  The racial and ethnic makeup of the population was 49.9% Mexican, 8.5% other Hispanic, 29.4% non-Hispanic white, 10.5% black or African American, 0.5% Native American, 0.5% Asian, and 2.3% two or more races.

Historic homes and buildings

Media
  WZZS-FM (106.9 The Bull)
 WZSP-FM (105.3 La Zeta)

See also
Streamsong Resort

References

External links 
 City of Bowling Green, FL Website

Cities in Hardee County, Florida
Cities in Florida